Claude Goasguen (12 March 1945 – 28 May 2020) was a French politician who served as a member of the National Assembly for Paris from 1993 to 1995 and again from 1997 until his death in 2020. A member of The Republicans, he also briefly was Minister of Reform of the State, Decentralisation and Citizenship in 1995 under Prime Minister Alain Juppé.

Biography

Early years
Claude Goasguen was born in Toulon, Var. He received a Doctorate in Law from Panthéon-Assas University. From 1976 to 1986, he taught at Paris 13 University, and he served as the Dean of the Law School from 1982 to 1984. From 1986 to 1988, he served as advisor to the Minister of National Education, René Monory, with regards to the links between universities and the private sector, and professional training. From December 1987 to January 1991, he served as university rector.

Cabinet member
From May to November 1995, he was Minister of State Reforms, Decentralisation and Citizenship. From April 1996 to May 1998, he was the General Secretary of the now defunct UDF, and from June 1998 to April 2002, he was vice-president and spokesperson of the defunct Liberal Democracy. Since 2003, he has also worked as a lawyer in Paris.

He was well known for his controversial comments on the Palestinian people and on the Muslim community living in France.

Goasguen was a vigorous supporter of oppressed Christian minorities in the Near East and has spoken prominently at public meetings concerning them in Autumn 2015. He was a recipient of the Legion of Honour. He died on 28 May 2020 in Issy-les-Moulineaux at the age of 75 from a heart attack after having contracted COVID-19 earlier in March during the COVID-19 pandemic in France. He was replaced in the Assembly by Sandra Boëlle.

References

1945 births
2020 deaths
Politicians from Toulon
French people of Breton descent
20th-century French lawyers
Politicians from Paris
Mayors of arrondissements of Paris
Union for French Democracy politicians
Centre of Social Democrats politicians
Liberal Democracy (France) politicians
Union for a Popular Movement politicians
The Republicans (France) politicians
Deputies of the 10th National Assembly of the French Fifth Republic
Deputies of the 11th National Assembly of the French Fifth Republic
Deputies of the 12th National Assembly of the French Fifth Republic
Deputies of the 13th National Assembly of the French Fifth Republic
Deputies of the 14th National Assembly of the French Fifth Republic
Deputies of the 15th National Assembly of the French Fifth Republic
Government ministers of France
Lycée Henri-IV alumni
Paris 2 Panthéon-Assas University alumni
Academic staff of Sorbonne Paris North University
Chevaliers of the Légion d'honneur
Councillors of Paris
Deaths from the COVID-19 pandemic in France
Burials at Passy Cemetery
Members of Parliament for Paris